Henry Traphagen (1842–1918), Mayor of Jersey City, New Jersey
Oliver Green Traphagen (1854–1932), American architect
Mitch Traphagen (born 1962) 
Charles Duryee Traphagen (1862–1947), American publisher of the Nebraska State Journal